Johann Weikhard Freiherr von Valvasor or Johann Weichard Freiherr von Valvasor or simply Valvasor (baptised on 28 May 1641 – September or October 1693) was a natural historian and polymath from Carniola, present-day Slovenia, and a fellow of the Royal Society in London. 

He is known as a pioneer of study of karst studies. Together with his other writings, until the late 19th century his best-known work—the 1689 Glory of the Duchy of Carniola, published in 15 books in four volumes—was the main source for older Slovenian history, making him one of the precursors of modern Slovenian historiography.

Biography
Valvasor was born in the town of Ljubljana, then in the Duchy of Carniola, today the capital of Slovenia, to an aristocratic family originally from Bergamo, Italy. In the 16th century, it was Johann Baptist Valvasor who moved the Valvasor family to the Duchy of Carniola in central Europe, to a part of the Habsburg monarchy that is now part of Slovenia. In medieval Latin Valvasor or Valvasore held the meaning 'carrier of a feud'.

Neither the exact day nor the actual place of Valvasor's birth are known, but his baptism was registered at Ljubljana Cathedral, where he was baptized Joannes Waichard Valvasor. He was the twelfth child born to Bartholomäus and Anna Maria Freiin von Rauber, who only lived at Medija Castle in Izlake but also had a town residence in Ljubljana at Old Square. His godparents were Freiherr (Baron) Konrad Ruess von Ruessenstein from Strmol Castle and Regina Dorothea Rasp from Krumperk Castle.

Valvasor's father died when the boy was ten years old. His mother died when he was 16. At the time he was attending the Jesuit school in Ljubljana. Graduating in 1659 at the age of seventeen, he did not choose to continue his studies at a university but decided to broaden his horizons by meeting learned men on a journey across Europe. This journey lasted fourteen years and it even took him to northern Africa. During this period, he joined the army in the Austro-Turkish War, where he became closely acquainted with the conditions on the Croatian Military Frontier.

Shortly after marrying Anna Rosina Grafenweger in 1672, Valvasor acquired Bogenšperk Castle near Litija, where he arranged a writing, drawing and printing workshop. Valvasor spent a fortune on the publishing of his books; towards the end of his life, his debts forced him to sell Bogenšperk Castle, his vast library and his collection of prints. In 1690, Aleksandar Ignacije Mikulić, the Bishop of Zagreb, bought his library, along with some 7,300 graphics, and moved it to Slavonia, where the collection became part of the library of the Zagreb Archbishopric, now part of the Croatian State Archives. 
In 1692, he lost most of his wealth because he invested in travel, graphics and printbooks. The same year he married 13-year-old Anna Maria Rosina Graffenweger, with whom he had nine children, among them daughters Maria Sidonia, Maximilla Kordula, Johanna Rosina, and Anna Theresia, and sons Wolfang Waikhard, Johann Gottlieb, Johann Ludwig, Johann Wolfgang Engelbert, and Franz Joseph. Five children died very early, and then, when delivering their last child in 1687, Anna Maria Rosina died as well. Just three months after her death, Valvasor married Baroness Anna Maximilla Zetschker of Vrhovo. They had four children. In 1693, the same year that their last child, Franz Engelbert, was baptized, Valvasor died at age 52 in Krško.

He is believed to have been buried in the family crypt at Medija Castle, but this is uncertain. The Yugoslav Partisans dynamited the castle in 1944 and no trace of his putative grave remains today.

Legacy

The Glory of the Duchy of Carniola
Valvasor's most important work remains The Glory of the Duchy of Carniola (original title: ,<ref>Johann Weichard von Valvasor: ,), published in 1689 in 15 books (four volumes), totalling 3532 pages and including 528 illustrations and 24 appendices, which provides a vivid description of Carniola at the time. He also recorded the first written document on vampires when he wrote on the legend of a vampire in Istria named Jure Grando.Boris Perić, Vampir, translated into Slovene by Iztok Osojnik, Zbirka Beri globalno, Ljubljana (Tuma) 2007. 

From 2009 until 2012, it was translated into Slovene by Doris, Primož and Božidar Debenjak. The initiator, project manager, editor and technical editor of this monumental publishing project was Tomaž Čeč.

Karst research
Valvasor was a pioneer of study of karst phenomena. Upon the proposal of Edmond Halley, who was not only an astronomer but also a geophysicist, and in 1687 his extensive treatise on the hydrology of intermittent Lake Cerknica won him a fellowship of the Royal Society.

 Works Dominicae passionis icones, 1679, reprint 1970 Topographia Ducatus Carnioliae modernae das ist Controfee aller Stätt, Märckht, Clöster und Schlösser, wie sie anietzo stehen in dem Herzogthumb Crain, 1679, reprint 1970 Topographia arcium Lambergianarum id est arces, castella et dominia in Carniolia habita possident comites a Lamberg; Bagenspergi (Bogenšperg), 1679 , reprint 1995 
 Topographia Archiducatus Carinthiae modernae: das ist Controfee aller Stätt, Märckht, Clöster, undt Schlösser, wie sie anietzo stehen in dem Ertzhertzogthumb Khärnten; Wagensperg in Crain (Bogenšperg), 1681 ; Nürnberg, 1688 Carniolia, Karstia, Histria et Windorum Marchia, Labaci (Ljubljana) 1681 Theatrum mortis humanae tripartitum: figuris aeneis illustratum : das ist: Schau-Bühne des menschlichen Todts in drey Theil : mit schönen Kupffer-Stichen geziehrt vnd an Tag gegeben; Laybach, Saltzburg (Ljubljana, Salzburg); 1682 Topographia Archiducatus Carinthiae antiquae & modernae completa: Das ist Vollkommene und gründliche Land – Beschreibung des berühmten Erz – Herzogthums Kärndten; Nürnberg 1688, Opus insignium armorumque ... ;(1687–1688) Die Ehre deß Hertzogthums Crain: das ist, Wahre, gründliche, und recht eigendliche Belegen- und Beschaffenheit dieses Römisch-Keyserlichen herrlichen Erblandes''; Laybach (Ljubljana) 1689

Notes

References

External links 

Valvasor.org – Life and work of Johann Weichard Freiherr von Valvasor
J.W.F. Valvasor Digital Library on scribd.com

 

1641 births
1693 deaths
Carniolan historians
Carniolan geographers
Carniolan ethnographers
Carniolan topographers
Carniolan cartographers
Carniolan alchemists
Carniolan publishers (people)
Carniolan soldiers
Carniolan inventors
Carniolan collectors
Carniolan nobility
Carniolan writers
German-language writers
Fellows of the Royal Society
Karstologists
17th-century cartographers
17th-century alchemists